Zhambyl may refer to:

Zhambyl Zhabaev, a Kazakh folk poet and singer (akyn), referred to as simply "Zhambyl"
Taraz (formerly Zhambyl), a city in Kazakhstan
Zhambyl Province, a province in south-east Kazakhstan